The Central District of Zanjan County is in Zanjan province, Iran. At the National Census in 2006, its population was 395,149 in 102,714 households. The following census in 2011 counted 442,924 people in 126,034 households. At the latest census in 2016, the district had 482,025 inhabitants in 147,145 households.

References 

Zanjan County

Districts of Zanjan Province

Populated places in Zanjan Province

Populated places in Zanjan County